NGC 6384 is an intermediate barred spiral galaxy located about 77 million light-years away in the northern part of the constellation Ophiuchus. It has a morphological classification of SAB(r)bc, indicating that it is a weakly barred galaxy (SAB) with an inner ring structure (r) orbiting the bar, and moderate to loosely wound spiral arms (bc). The galaxy is inclined by an angle of 47° to the line of sight, along a position angle of 40°. The estimated mass of the stars in this galaxy is 105 billion times the mass of the Sun.

At one time NGC 6384 was considered a normal galaxy with no activity in the nucleus. However, it is now classified as a transition object (T2), which is thought to be a LINER-type galaxy whose emission-line spectra is contaminated by H II regions in the nucleus.

On 24 June 1971, a type Ia supernova event was discovered in this galaxy at 27″ east and 20″ north of the nucleus. It reached a peak visual magnitude of 12.85 around the end of June. Designated SN 1971L, it was situated along a spiral arm, suggesting that the progenitor was not a member of the older, more evolved stellar population of the galaxy.

Gallery

References

External links

 
 

Ophiuchus (constellation)
Barred spiral galaxies
6384
10891